The Henry K. List House, also known as the Wheeling-Moundsville Chapter of the American Red Cross, is a historic home located at 827 Main Street in Wheeling, Ohio County, West Virginia. It was built in 1858, and consists of a two-story square main block with an offset two-story rear wing. The brick mansion features a low-pitched hipped roof with a balustraded square cupola. It has Renaissance Revival and Italianate design details.  The building was once occupied by the Ohio Valley Red Cross.

It was listed on the National Register of Historic Places in 1978.

See also
List of historic sites in Ohio County, West Virginia
List of Registered Historic Places in West Virginia
Sonnencroft

References

External links

Houses in Wheeling, West Virginia
Landmarks in West Virginia
Houses on the National Register of Historic Places in West Virginia
Houses completed in 1858
Italianate architecture in West Virginia
Renaissance Revival architecture in West Virginia
Historic American Buildings Survey in West Virginia
National Register of Historic Places in Wheeling, West Virginia